"Baby Doe" may refer to:

Individuals
Baby Doe Tabor, (1854–1935) the wife of a wealthy businessman
Bella Bond, a previously unidentified toddler discovered dead in Massachusetts in 2015

Other uses
Baby Doe Law
Baby Doe (pseudonym), a pseudonym for an unidentified baby
The Ballad of Baby Doe, an opera based on the life of Baby Doe Tabor